Brownlowia is a genus of flowering plants in the family Malvaceae.

Species include:
Brownlowia arachnoidea
Brownlowia argentata
Brownlowia calciphila	
Brownlowia clemensiae	
Brownlowia cuspidata	
Brownlowia denysiana	
Brownlowia dictyopsila
Brownlowia eberhardtii
Brownlowia elata	
Brownlowia elliptica
Brownlowia emarginata
Brownlowia ferruginea	
Brownlowia fluminensis
Brownlowia glabrata	
Brownlowia grandistipulata	
Brownlowia havilandii	
Brownlowia helferiana
Brownlowia kleinhovioidea	
Brownlowia macrophylla	
Brownlowia ovalis
Brownlowia paludosa	
Brownlowia palustris	
Brownlowia peltata
Brownlowia purseglovei	
Brownlowia riparia	
Brownlowia rubra
Brownlowia sarawhensis	
Brownlowia sarwonoi	
Brownlowia stipulata	
Brownlowia tabularis	
Brownlowia tersa	
Brownlowia velutina

References

 
Malvaceae genera
Taxonomy articles created by Polbot